Solo John/Solo Scott is a split-EP by John Walker and Scott Walker, members of the American pop group The Walker Brothers. It was released in 1966 and reached number four on the UK EP Chart. While the EP was released as two solo efforts due to it being released while the group was active, it is generally categorised as a Walker Brothers release.

The EP was produced by John Franz with musical accompaniment directed by Reg Guest. It includes the original Scott Walker composition "Mrs. Murphy". All four tracks have since been re-released on the expanded edition of The Walker Brothers' second album, Portrait.

Track listing
 Philips - BE 12597

Personnel
 John Walker – vocals ("Sunny" and "Come Rain or Come Shine")
 Scott Walker – vocals ("The Gentle Rain" and "Mrs. Murphy")
 John Franz – producer
 Reg Guest – accompaniment direction

Chart positions

References

1966 EPs
The Walker Brothers EPs